Ludvig Nessa (born 11 December 1949) is a Norwegian Lutheran priest who has been noted as a fierce opponent against legalised abortion in Norway since the 1980s, staging various anti-abortion protests and other controversial stunts. Nessa was defrocked from the Church of Norway in 1989, confirmed after an appeal in 1991, which led him to co-found the independent Deanery of Strandebarm (also known as the "Church of Norway in Exile") together with fellow priests Børre Knudsen and Per Kørner. Church services administered by Nessa has been broadcast on Visjon Norge since 2014.

Pro-life activism
Appointed priest of Borge og Torsnes in Østfold in 1979, Nessa founded the "New Life Action" Aksjon Nytt Liv along with Børre Knudsen in 1987 in order to stage protests against abortion. They staged their first non-violent protest against abortion at a hospital in Oslo, and later protested with symbolic burials of small coffins, and sending dolls drenched in ketchup to public figures and politicians. Nessa was defrocked from the Church of Norway in 1989, confirmed after an appeal to the Eidsivating Court of Appeal in 1991. Together with Knudsen and Per Kørner he thereafter co-founded the Deanery of Strandebarm, also known as the "Church of Norway in Exile".

In 1999 Nessa went into "church asylum" at a Gospel Hall as he was due to serve time in prison for refusing to pay fines received for his anti-abortion protests. He was arrested later the same year and sent to serve his penalty of 53 days imprisonment.

For the 2005 and 2009 parliamentary elections Nessa headed the Abortion Opponents' List along with Ivar Kristianslund, Per Kørner and Børre Knudsen.

In 2013 Nessa was notified from tax authorities that he risked being registered as "emigrated from Norway", as since he was evicted from his parish residence in 1991 has been registered as "homeless". He alternates between residing in a Gospel Hall in Fredrikstad and his cabin in Sarpsborg.

Other activism
Nessa has criticised the increasing influence of Muslims and Islam in Norway, and stated that only "true Christians" will be able to "resist Islam". He has proposed and stated his willingness to burn the Quran after comedian Otto Jespersen in 2006 burned a Bible, and he has voiced his support for American Quran-burning pastor Terry Jones.

He has suggested that the 2011 Norway attacks may have been caused spiritually as a result of Norwegian abortion policies. As part of an annual marking against abortion on the date of its legalisation in Norway, 13 June, Nessa and his followers have routinely "banished" the Government quarter that was bombed on 22 July.

In 2012 he sent emails to Norwegian members of parliament, denouncing a bill that would separate the church from the state as a "coup" and a "revolution", and threatening to "banish" Norwegian politicians responsible for it.

In 2019 Nessa held a speech at a demonstration of Stop Islamisation of Norway (SIAN) where also a Quran was burned. In his speech he called for Islam to be banned. As an anti-Islam activist he has participated in later SIAN-demonstrations as well, and held church services titled after his experiences.

References

1949 births
Living people
Counter-jihad activists
Norwegian priests
Norwegian anti-abortion activists
Norwegian critics of Islam
Stop Islamisation of Norway